Seaport Village is a waterfront shopping and dining complex adjacent to San Diego Bay in downtown San Diego, California. It is located at 849 West Harbor Drive, at the intersection of Harbor Drive and Kettner.

The Village contains several freestanding buildings in an assortment of architectural styles, from Victorian to traditional Mexican. It is designed to be a car-free environment, with four miles (6 km) of winding paths rather than streets connecting the various buildings. It is located in walking distance from the San Diego Convention Center and the cruise ship terminal. It is currently under redevelopment planning, with construction to begin approximately 2025. It will remain operational until construction begins, according to the Port District.

History 
Seaport Village was built on landfill over Punta de los Muertos (Spanish for Point of the Dead), where the Spanish expedition of 1782 buried those who had died of scurvy.  In later years it was a railroad yard where goods and other materials used to come through the area.

Seaport Village was developed by Morris Taubman. The center broke ground in 1978 and opened in 1980. It is owned by the Port of San Diego and is under the management of Protea Management Properties.

Shops 
More than 50 shops line the walkways. The shops are geared toward tourists, with merchandise ranging from cruise-ware and San Diego souvenirs to specialty vendors.

Restaurants 
Seaport Village is home to several bay-view restaurants.  In addition, a food court and many snack stands are available. There is also a cafe aboard the adjacent, unrelated U.S.S. Midway aircraft carrier museum.

Carousel
The center features a working carousel with hand-carved animals, built in 1895. It replaces a slightly smaller original carousel, which was sold in 2004 by the trust that owned it.

See also
 Old Police Headquarters

References

External links 
 Seaport Village website
 Old version of Seaport Village website (since 1997)

Buildings and structures in San Diego
Shopping malls in San Diego County, California
San Diego Bay
Shopping malls established in 1980
1980 establishments in California
Tourist attractions in San Diego